is a fictional character in the Tekken series of fighting games by Namco, where she was introduced in the original Tekken in 1994. A young woman of Chinese and Native American descent, Michelle possesses a mysterious pendant allegedly capable of controlling evil and powerful spirits. The pendant has caused many problems in Michelle's life, including her father's killing by Heihachi Mishima's men when he failed to retrieve the treasure, as well as her mother and even her own kidnappings in later years. She later becomes the adoptive mother of Julia Chang, who masters her mother's discipline. 

Michelle is dropped from the canonical games after Tekken 2, but continues to appear in the series' spin-offs. She has also appeared in other media related to the series, including animated films and comics.

Design and gameplay
Michelle debuted in the Tekken series at the age of 18, which, alongside Anna Williams, made her the youngest human character to debut in the series until Ling Xiaoyu, who debuted in Tekken 3 at the age of 16. She is 20 years old in Tekken 2 and chronologically would be 41 as of Tekken 6; however, due to her never making a canonical appearance since Tekken 2 (aside from a cameo in her daughter Julia's ending in Tekken 3), she appeared in Tekken Tag Tournament and Tekken Tag Tournament 2 in her Tekken 2 appearance, making her physically comparable to her daughter, Julia, who too appeared in both games and is around 20 years of age as of Tekken 7.

During an early development of Tekken Tag Tournament 2, some of Michelle's motion capture was done by the series producer Katsuhiro Harada. On Twitter, Harada complained about the "spam" from fans demanding to bring back Michelle and Jun Kazama, even after they were both confirmed to return in this game.

Michelle utilized a variation of Kenpo called "Chang kenpo" mixed with Xingyiquan. Her style and moveset were later adopted by her adopted daughter and substitute in the series, Julia. She still used the same fighting style in Tekken Tag Tournament 2, but she gained several unique moves to differentiate herself from both Wang and Julia.

According to Prima Games' guide to the original Tekken, "though she does not have the awesome power of the heavy hitters, Michelle can tear through her enemies with fast counters and spectacular juggles. Michelle is next to unbeatable once you have mastered her ability to evade attacks and counter with lingering juggles." Similarly, a Hyper guide to Tekken 2 states that Michelle was often underestimated due to her lack of flashy moves, but for those who learned using her properly she could become one of the most deadly characters in the game. In Tekken Tag Tournament, Michelle is extremely fast; she is supposed to be played very aggressively as her combos hit all levels, causing problems for the opponents to block them all. She is also able to perform devastating counters and has a large number of moves that can start juggle combos. However, she can be a very difficult character to play.

Appearances

In video games
Michelle Chang is a Chinese-Native American woman (her father was from Hong Kong and her mother is a Native American from Arizona) and the foster mother of Julia Chang. Michelle's father had been ordered by Heihachi to search for an ancient treasure of the Native Americans; a pendant allegedly capable of controlling powerful spirits, which is owned by Michelle. When he failed to retrieve it for Heihachi, the latter ordered his men to murder him. This fact is presented by Michelle's mother when she turns eighteen; she thus sets out to enter The King of Iron Fist Tournament in order to take revenge against Heihachi. Michelle encounters and defeats Kunimitsu, a female ninja treasure hunter that was seeking the pendant, and secures the amulet. She promptly withdraws from the tournament; as she has achieved what she then realises should have been her main goal, and although she does not win the tournament, Michelle is still satisfied that another fighter (Kazuya Mishima) defeated Heihachi.

In Tekken 2, Michelle's mother has been kidnapped by Ganryu, who is working for Kazuya, who desires the pendant. She has entered the tournament to rescue her mother. Michelle meets Ganryu and battles him. After defeating Ganryu, she rescues her mother and returns home. However, unknown to her, Ganryu has fallen in love with her.

A couple of years later, Michelle discovers an abandoned baby girl nearby her village. She adopts the infant, names her Julia, and loves her as if she were her own daughter. When Julia grows into a teenager, Michelle teaches her Chinese martial arts such as xingyiquan. Michelle's tribe grow worried when various martial artists around the world disappeared, allegedly because of the awakening of Ogre, whose legends have been passed on within the tribe. They fear that Michelle's pendant is the suspect. Michelle departs for Japan to ask Heihachi why he sought her pendant before, but she fails to return. Julia has entered the tournament to rescue her mother. She appears in Julia's ending, being reunited with her adopted daughter. Her further fate has never been canonically resolved within the games.

She appears as a playable character in Tekken Tag Tournament and is one of the console-exclusive returning characters via free downloadable content (DLC) in Tekken Tag Tournament 2 (first introduced as pre-order bonus from GameStop). In her TTT2 ending movie, Michelle dons a mask to team-up with Jaycee (Julia) in lucha libre professional wrestling, although fans may call her M.C, similar to J.C.

In other media
Michelle appears in the anime film Tekken: The Motion Picture with a bigger role than most of the other contenders. Before the tournament, she attempts to kill Heihachi with a tomahawk, but Heihachi breaks the axe with his teeth and welcomes Michelle's challenge if she makes it to the tower. Michelle encounters and defeats Ganryu, but is beaten by Kazuya to the point that she begs him to let her face Heihachi and take revenge for Heihachi burning down her village and inadvertently killing both her parents. Kazuya, knowing that Michelle will be killed, refuses. Michelle continues to attack Kazuya relentlessly until he beats her into submission and nearly mercy-kills her, but is stopped by Jun's intervention. She is later found and rescued from the crumbling island by Paul Phoenix. She is voiced by Narumi Hidaka in the original Japanese version and by Jessica Robertson in the English dub. Michelle also appears in the comics Tekken Saga, Tekken 2, Tekken: Tatakai no Kanatani, and Tekken Forever.

Reception
According to Liz Faber's book Computer Game Graphics (1999), "Michelle Chan, a 'superbabe' who cuts a nice line in denim hot-pants in Tekken epitomizes the racially diverse characters that populate the modern [video] games." The New York Times "Game Theory" columnist JC Herz claimed that Michelle, having an Asian name but ambiguous features, is "such a confused mixture of signs" that she "represents a perfect metaphor of video games themselves."

A 1997 article in Game On! USA, highlighted her, Chun Li, Mai Shiranui, and Jill Valentine as the female "video game characters who have marked the near absurd level of popularity." In 2008, FHM listed Michelle as one of the "female vixens that are equally tough and certainly hot", representing Tekken along with Nina Williams and Christie Monteiro. Complex featured Michelle among the 50 "hottest women in video games" in 2010, and ranked her as the 13th "best looking sideline chick in games" in 2011.

Andrew Bridgman from Dorkly listed her as one of the most stereotypical Native American characters in fighting game history, ranking her at seventh place, tying with her daughter Julia. Andrew Rivera from Complex compared her to the Street Fighter series character T. Hawk. In an official poll by Namco, Michelle was the 26th most requested Tekken character to be added to the roster of Tekken X Street Fighter.

See also
List of Tekken characters

References

Female characters in anime and manga
Female characters in video games
Fictional American people in video games
Fictional characters from Arizona
Fictional Chinese American people
Fictional martial artists in video games
Fictional female martial artists
Fictional hapkido practitioners
Fictional kenpō practitioners
Fictional Native American people in video games
Fictional Xing Yi Quan practitioners
Tekken characters
Woman soldier and warrior characters in video games
Video game characters introduced in 1994
Fictional Native American women